Northwest Press is an American publisher specializing in LGBT-themed comic books and graphic novels. It was founded in 2010 by Charles "Zan" Christensen. The company publishes in print, as well as through digital channels such as ComiXology and Apple's iBooks, and also retails some similarly-themed books published independently.

Controversy 
Northwest has had repeated conflicts with Apple's content limitations on sales through the iBooks store. In 2011, an adaptation by Tom Bouden of Oscar Wilde's play The Importance of Being Earnest was only approved after the addition of black bars to cover partial male nudity. The technology company initially permitted the individual issues of Jon Macy's Fearful Hunter, but rejected the collected edition, then removed the issues. The satirical Al-Qaeda’s Super Secret Weapon was rejected outright. In 2016, Northwest published a self-censored version of Hard to Swallow by Justin Hall and Dave Davenport – covering the "objectionable" parts with images of apples – when the original version was rejected due to sexual content.

Awards 
The company's publications have won awards. Teleny and Camille by Jon Macy won the 2011 Lambda Literary Award for Gay Erotica. Anything That Loves, edited by Christensen, won the 2013 Bisexual Book Award for nonfiction. Rob Kirby's QU33R received the 2014 Ignatz Award for Outstanding Anthology. Unpacking by Steve MacIsaac was nominated for the 2019 Lambda Literary Award for LGBTQ Graphic Novels.

Titles 
 Absolute Power: Tales of Queer Villainy (anthology)
 Al-Qaeda’s Super Secret Weapon by Mohammad al-Mohamed Muhammad and Youssef Fakish
The Big Book of Bisexual Trials and Errors by Elizabeth Beier
 Anything That Loves (anthology) edited by Zan Christensen
 Capitol Hillbillies by Chris Lange
 The Completely Unfabulous Social Life of Ethan Green by Eric Orner
 Dash by Dave Ebersole and Delia Gable
 Fearful Hunter by Jon Macy
 Hard to Swallow by Justin Hall and Dave Davenport
 The Importance of Being Earnest by Tom Bouden (based on the play by Oscar Wilde)
 The Lavender Menace: Tales of Queer Villainy (prose anthology)
 The Legend of Bold Riley by Leia Weathington and Jonathon Dalton
 Mama Tits Saves the World by Zan Christensen and Terry Blas
 The Mark of Aeacus by Zan Christensen and Mark Brill
 Politically InQueerect by Dylan Edwards
 Positive by Tom Bouden
 The Power Within by Zan Christensen and Mark Brill
 QU33R (anthology) edited by Rob Kirby
 Rainy Day Recess: The Complete Steven’s Comics by David Kelly
 Rise: Comics Against Bullying (anthology)
 Teleny and Camille by Jon Macy (based on the book attributed to Oscar Wilde)
13: The Astonishing Lives of the Neuromantics by Yves Navant
 Transposes by Dylan Edwards
Unpacking by Steve MacIsaac
 A Waste of Time by Rick Worley

References

External links 
 
 
 

Publishing companies established in 2010
Comic book publishing companies of the United States
LGBT book publishing companies